The National Heritage List for England (NHLE) is England's official database of protected heritage assets. It includes details of all English listed buildings, scheduled monuments, register of historic parks and gardens, protected shipwrecks, and registered battlefields. It is maintained by Historic England, a government body, and brings together these different designations as a single resource even though they vary in the type of legal protection afforded to them. Although not designated by Historic England, World Heritage Sites also appear on the NHLE; conservation areas do not appear since they are designated by the relevant local planning authority.

The passage of the Ancient Monuments Protection Act 1882 established the first part of what the list is today, by granting protection to 50 prehistoric monuments. Amendments to this act increased the levels of protection and added more monuments to the list. Beginning in 1948, the Town and Country Planning Acts created the first listed buildings and the process for adding properties to it. , more than 600,000 properties are listed individually. Each year additional properties are added to the national list, via the registers that comprise the list.

The National Heritage List for England was launched in 2011 as the statutory list of all designated historic places including listed buildings and scheduled monuments.

The list is managed by Historic England (formerly part of English Heritage), and is available as an online database with over 400,000 listed buildings, registered parks, gardens and battlefields, protected shipwrecks and scheduled monuments.  A unique NHLE reference number is frequently used to refer to the related database entry; for example, 1285296 refers to Douglas House, a Grade II* listed building in the London Borough of Richmond upon Thames.

See also
 Local Heritage List
 List of heritage registers

References

External links

2011 establishments in England
Databases in England
England-related lists
Heritage registers in England
Historic England
Lists of monuments and memorials in the United Kingdom